Ishbara (Old Turkic: 𐰃𐱁𐰉𐰺𐰀; Chinese: 沙缽略 Pinyin: Shābōlüè) — a Turkic name deriving from Sanskrit ईश्वर (Īśvara). The name was carried by different rulers in history:

 Ishbara Qaghan, East Gokturk khagan (581-587)
 Ishbara Tolis, West Gokturk khagan (634-639)
 Irbis Ishbara Yabgu Qaghan, West Gokturk khagan (640-641)
 Ashina Wushibo, Yabgu of Tokharistan (645-705), grandson of Tong Yabghu Qaghan
Ashina Helu, West Gokturk khagan (651-658)